Jordi Rebellón López (15 February 1957 – 8 September 2021) was a Spanish television, cinema and stage actor known for his role as Rodolfo Vilches in popular television series Hospital Central.

Biography 
Jordi Rebellón López was born in Barcelona on 15 February 1957. He made his television debut with a minor performance in Barrio Sésamo.

In 2000, he joined the cast of Hospital Central to play Dr. Vilches, a role for which he became extremely popular in Spain. He left the series in the 14th season, but returned in the 18th season. 

He died from a stroke on 8 September 2021 in Madrid.

Works 
Television series
 Hospital Central as Doctor Rodolfo Vilches (2000–2012)
 Mercado Central as Fernando Luján
 Cuéntame cómo pasó as Pachín.
 Sin identidad as Francisco José Fuentes.
 Amar es para siempre as Luis Ardanza.
 Médico de familia as Ángel Valverde.
 Servir y proteger as Alfonso Ocaña.
 Makinavaja as Sargento Oroño
  as Mateo Ibarra.

Television programs
 Tu cara me suena, as guest (2015)
 , as guest (2017)

Filmography
 El complot dels anells (1988)
  (1989)
  (1990)
 El largo invierno (1992)
 J.V. (1993)
  (1993)
 Mal de amores, como el chico del noticiario. Dir. Carlos Balagué (1993)
 Todo falso (Ni un pam de net) (1993)
 Adiós Tiburón (1996)
 Reflejos de una dama (2001)
 Ausencias (2001)
 Roma no paga traidores (2002)
 GAL (2006)
 Enloquecidas (2008)
 Beige (2012)

Theater
 Quan Spidoux s'adorm
 Don Joan Moliere
 L’hostal de la Gloria
 Mentiras, incienso y mirra (2008)
 Don Juan Tenorio (2010)
 Desclasificados (2013)
 El funeral (2018)

Books
 Yo quise ser Supermán, ed. Suma, ISBN 9788483658062.

Awards
 for best actor for Hospital Central (2003).
Fotograma de Plata Award nomination for Best Actor for Hospital Central (2006)
TP de Oro for best series Hospital Central (2007)
Award "Brujo del Año" granted by the Federación de Peñas Festeras y Culturales de las Fiestas de Mayo de Alcantarilla (2010)

References

External links

1957 births
2021 deaths
20th-century Spanish male actors
21st-century Spanish male actors
Male actors from Barcelona